Tasmannia membranea is a shrub native to North Queensland, Australia.

References

External links
 Australian Plant Name Index 

membranea
Taxa named by Ferdinand von Mueller